Doctor Glas is a 1968 Danish drama film directed by Mai Zetterling, based on the novel of the same name. According to Fox records the film required $500,000 in rentals to break even and by 11 December 1970 had made $125,000 so made a loss to the studio. It was listed to compete at the 1968 Cannes Film Festival, but the festival was cancelled due to the events of May 1968 in France. It is based on a 1905 novel Doctor Glas by Hjalmar Söderberg which had previously been made into a 1942 Swedish film of the same title.

Cast
 Per Oscarsson as Dr. Glas
 Lone Hertz as Helga Gregorius
 Ulf Palme as Rev. Gregorius, Helga's husband
 Bente Dessau as Eva Martens
 Nils Eklund as Markel, journalist
 Lars Lunøe as Klas Recke, Helga's lover
 Berndt Rothe as Birck
 Helle Hertz as Anita
 Ingolf David as Dr. Glas' father
 Jonas Bergström as A university friend of Dr. Glas

References

External links

1968 films
1960s Danish-language films
1968 drama films
Films directed by Mai Zetterling
Danish drama films
Films based on Swedish novels